Denise Long Rife (born Denise Long; 1951) is an American former basketball player. She was the first woman drafted by an NBA team when San Francisco Warriors owner Franklin Mieuli picked her in the 13th round in the 1969 NBA draft. However, the selection was voided.

Early life 
Rife was born in Whitten, Iowa, a town of fewer than 200 inhabitants, where her mother was the postmaster.

Basketball career

NBA draft 
Rife was the first woman drafted by a National Basketball Association (NBA) team, although NBA Commissioner Walter Kennedy vetoed the pick on grounds that, at the time, the league did not draft players straight from high school—nor women.

San Francisco Warriors owner Franklin Mieuli picked her in the 13th round of the 1969 NBA draft, but she played for a women's team—the "Warrior Girls Basketball League"—that the Warriors sponsored for one season rather than for the Warriors themselves. (Among the players drafted after Long was USC star Mack Calvin, who was picked in the 14th round by the Los Angeles Lakers but instead went to the ABA, where he became a five-time All-Star.)

Basketball career 
According to the Warriors' YouTube channel, she was picked to be the league's star. She was 19 years old, 5'11" tall, and a graduate of Union-Whitten High School, where her class had only 34 students enrolled; the opportunity to go to San Francisco was irresistible. While there she met Wilt Chamberlain, who joked that she had broken his triple-digit shooting record. In 2018, the Warriors invited her and some of the other women from her league to a halftime ceremony honoring them during Women's History Month.

Rife played forward and was at her best shooting from the deep perimeter (before the 3-pointer became part of the game). At a time when "combined final game scores often finished well above 200 points", she repeatedly scored over 100 points in a single high school game. In one game, Rife recalled, a forward ended up guarding her because all of the guards on the opposition's team had fouled out trying to keep her from scoring. Her career record of 6,250 points lasted until Lynne Lorenzen bested her in the mid-1980s by nearly 500 points. She was inducted into the Iowa Girls Basketball Hall of Fame in 1975.

In pre-Title IX America, "girls' basketball in Iowa did not need a federal mandate to be more popular than boys’ basketball. ... The television audience for the girls’ championship game drew as many as 3.5 million viewers in nine Midwestern states," and championship game week was the biggest week of the economic year for Des Moines merchants. The 1968 championship game that her team won is available on YouTube. As Rife noted, for girls in small-town Iowa, basketball could be a lifesaver.

Her prowess led to attention from Sports Illustrated,  which described her as "all swiftness and grace"; The Tonight Show, hosted at the time by fellow Iowan Johnny Carson; the Wall Street Journal, and other American media outlets. She was offered college scholarships but pre-Title IX women's college basketball was too limited to appeal to her.

In the era in question, women's high school basketball generally had 6-member teams and it was played as a half-court rather than full-court game, in which some of the offensive team players stayed back at their end of the court while the defensive team members followed their opponents to the other end of the court. During the summer of 1973, Rife played for the Venture Victory Team, "a Christian team where we went over and gave testimonies and sang Christian songs at half-time" during games against the Olympics teams from various Asian countries. This was full-court basketball, which she found challenging. In an interview with the Iowa PBS network, Rife discussed significant differences between the two versions of the game, explaining why women's basketball in her era was so exciting for audiences.

Post basketball career 
After basketball, she studied at various colleges, including Faith Baptist Bible College, where she got degrees in physical education, in Bible theology, and eventually a degree in pharmacy from Drake University. She worked as a pharmacist until retirement.

See also
 List of basketball players who have scored 100 points in a single game

References 

1951 births
Living people
21st-century American women
American women's basketball players
Basketball players from Iowa
Drake University alumni
People from Hardin County, Iowa
Pharmacists from Iowa
San Francisco Warriors draft picks
Women pharmacists